Orgasm (later reissued as Cave Rock) is the only album by the experimental band Cromagnon, released in 1969 by the ESP-Disk record label.

Background and recording
Orgasm was recorded at A-1 Sound Studio in the Upper West Side of New York City in 1969. Phil Spector's Wall of Sound technique, of which producer Brian Elliot was a fan, heavily influenced the album's sound. During recording, band members brought in random people from the street and asked them to contribute to the album.

On the album's conception, band member Sal Salgado recalled:

Musical style
Critics have noted how Orgasm anticipated the rise of noise rock, industrial and no wave genres that came into existence in the following decades. Alex Henderson of AllMusic described the track "Caledonia" as sounding "like it could be a Ministry or Revolting Cocks recording from 1989 rather than a psychedelic recording from 1969."

Another critic, describing the album, said:

Release and legacy
Orgasm was originally released in 1969. The album was released onto CD in 1993 and was re-released three more times, in 2000, 2005 and 2009. Music author Jason Weiss wrote that the album "eventually developed a minor cult following and was hailed as a pioneer in sound collage experiments".

AllMusic's Alex Henderson writes of the album: "Depending on one's point of view, Cave Rock is either a ridiculously self-indulgent artifact of the '60s counterculture or an underground gem that was way ahead of its time – and it's probably a little bit of both." Jennifer Kelly of Dusted Reviews agrees with Henderson, writing "There’s a palpable fog of self-indulgence hanging over the whole enterprise, a sense of weirdness for weirdness’ sake and lack of discipline or structure. Still, there’s no question that Cromagnon achieved something remarkable in its strange concoction of noise, spoken word, folk, electronics and field recordings."

Pitchfork Media ranked the song "Caledonia" at number 163 on its list of "The 200 Greatest Songs of the 1960s".

In 2007, the Japanese band Ghost covered the track "Caledonia" for their album In Stormy Nights.

Track listing

Personnel
The following people contributed to Orgasm:

Band
Austin Grasmere (lead vocals, music)
Brian Elliot (lead vocals, music)

Connecticut Tribe:
Peter Bennett (bass guitar)
Jimmy Bennett (guitar, bagpipes)
Vinnie Howley (guitar)
Sal Salgado (percussion)
Nelle Tresselt (honorary tribe member)
Mark Payuk (vocals)
Gary Leslie (vocals, multi-sound effects)

References

External links
Interview with members of Cromagnon on the making of Cave Rock

1969 albums
ESP-Disk albums
Cromagnon (band) albums
Outsider music albums
Sound collage albums
Noise music albums by American artists